Dungarvan was a constituency represented in the Irish House of Commons until 1800.

History
In the Patriot Parliament of 1689 summoned by James II, Dungarvan was represented with two members.

Members of Parliament, 1610–1801
1560 Henry Stafford (or Gifford) and John Challoner
1613–1615 Peter Rowe and Thomas Fitz-Harrys 
1634–1635 Sir Peter Smithe of Ballynatray and John Hore 
1639–1649 Sir Richard Osborne, 2nd Baronet and John Hore 
1661–1665 John Fitzgerald of Dromana and Sir Allen Broderick

1689–1801

Notes

References

Bibliography

Constituencies of the Parliament of Ireland (pre-1801)
Dungarvan
Historic constituencies in County Waterford
1610 establishments in Ireland
1800 disestablishments in Ireland
Constituencies established in 1610
Constituencies disestablished in 1800